The 1980-81 French Rugby Union Championship was won by Béziers beating Stade Bagnérais in the final.

Formula 
For the second time, the clubs of the "Group B" didn't participate to win the title, but played a proper championship.

The group A, like the group B was divided in four pools of ten clubs.

The eight better of each pool were qualified for the knockout stages.

Group A

Qualification round 
In bold the teams qualified for knock out stages, ordered according to the ranking.

"Last 32"

"Last 16" 
In bold the clubs qualified for the next round

Quarter of finals 
In bold the clubs qualified for the next round

Semifinals

Final 

Béziers held their title of French Champions and won the fourth Bouclier de Brennus in five years.  Stade Bagnérais lost the second final, after the one in 1979.

Group B

Qualification round 
In bold the teams qualified for knockout stages, ordered according to the ranking.

"Last 32"

"Last 16" 
In bold the clubs qualified for the next round

Quarter of finals 
In bold the clubs qualified for the next round

Semifinals

Final

External links
 Compte rendu finale de 1981 lnr.fr

Notes and references 

1981
France 1981
Championship